This article is about the coat of arms of the German state Free Hanseatic City of Bremen and the city of Bremen.

Description
From the Bremen Official Website:
The Coat-of-Arms of the Free Hanseatic City of Bremen shows a silver key on a red shield. The key is the attribute of Simon Petrus, patron saint of the Bremen Cathedral, and it was first represented in the seal of the City of Bremen in 1366, after its liberation from the occupation by Prince-Archbishop Albert II, and later became the main element of the city's coat-of-arms.

History
Bremen's red and white colors derive from the colors of the Hanseatic League. Starting in the 16th century, the shield was supported by angels, but from 1568, however, they were replaced by lions. In 1617 a helmet was added, but it was never officially part of the coat of arms. The crown on the coat of arms dates from the late 16th century.

In 1811, Napoleon Bonaparte added three bees to the coat of arms. The bees were used to claim that the Napoleonic Empire had Frankish heritage. Representations of bees were 1653 in the grave of Childeric I. They are meant to act as a symbol of France's ideals on immortality and rebirth. Napoleon also changed the colors of the coat of arms to the red and gold of his family, this being the only time Bremen used a coat of arms not featuring the historical colors of Bremen, red and white.

After the Napoleonic era, Bremen's previous coat of arms, a silver key on red, were restored.

See also
Flag of Bremen
Coat of arms of Germany
Origin of the coats of arms of German federal states.

References

Bremen (city)
Bremen (state)
Bremen
Bremen
Culture of Bremen (state)
Culture in Bremen (city)
Bremen
Bremen
Bremen